Murroe , officially spelled Moroe, is a village in County Limerick, Ireland.

Environs

Murroe is located in the north-eastern part of County Limerick, approximately 15 km from Limerick City and close to the County Tipperary border. Nearby towns include Cappamore and Newport. The village is located on the R506 road. It is surrounded by the Slieve Felim Mountains.

History
The first Roman Catholic church was erected in Murroe village around 1731. This was replaced by a second church on the main street in 1807. The parish priest in 1808 was Daniel O'Brien. This second church was described as by Samuel Lewis in 1837 “a large and handsome building”. The third and final church was erected in 1905. There were two fairs held in the village (in April and October) from at least 1825.

The village expanded in the late 1820s with the arrival of the Anglican Rev. Thomas P. Le Fanu (father of Sheridan Le Fanu) to the neighbouring parish of Abington and Sir Matthew Barrington (1788–1861), 2nd Barrington baronets of Limerick to Glenstal Castle. In 1828, Le Fanu and Matthew Barrington established a dispensary on the main street. In 1926, Glenstal Castle became Glenstal Abbey monastery and boarding school.

Murroe once had eight primary schools in the area. Each of the schools, called Murroe, Clonkeen, Eyon, Kiskiquirk were split into a boys' and girls' school.

John Canon Hayes, founder of Muintir na Tíre, was born in Murroe in 1882. He was a priest of the Archdiocese of Cashel and Emly, ordained at the Irish College, Paris in 1913 and died at Bansha, County Tipperary, where he was the parish priest, in 1957.

Landmarks 
The village contains the Murroe Memorial Cross, a prominent War of Independence memorial in the form of a modern highly decorated Celtic high cross. It was erected in May 1923 to commemorate the men of the east Limerick and Mid Limerick brigades of the Irish Republican Army who lost their lives in the Irish War of Independence. It is believed to be one of the first such large scale memorials erected in the State after the war.  

Clonkeen Church was founded as a monastery c. AD 600, is located approximately 4.4 km (2.7 ml) west of the village

Murroe is also situated near an older monastic settlement of Abbey Owney and is home to a number of historical houses and buildings, such as Brittas Castle and Thomond Scout centre.

Amenities
It is designated as a National Waymarked Trail by the National Trails Office of the Irish Sports Council and is managed by Shannon Development and Coillte.

The gardens and lands of Glenstal monastery are accessible to the public.

The Clare Glens wooded area along the banks of the Clare River is located on the edge of the townland towards Newport.

Sporting and cultural organisations in Murroe include Murroe Boher Amateur Dramatic Society, the Marion Active Retirement Club, Mulcair Men's Shed, Glenstal walkers, Murroe AFC (situated in Tubber), Murroe/Boher GAA, and Murroe-Boher Scouts.

References

Towns and villages in County Limerick